This is a list of music-related events in 1802.

Events
January 9 – The Harmonic Society of Philadelphia is founded, with native composer Andrew Law as its president.
January 20 – Luigi Boccherini receives a pension from Joseph Bonaparte.
February 15 – Muzio Clementi publishes the second volume of his Practical Harmony.
March 19 – Composer François-Adrien Boieldieu marries dancer Clotilde Mafleuray.
April 30 – Louis Spohr begins his violin studies under Franz Eck.
May 5 
Composer Giovanni Paisiello, recently arrived in Paris, meets his host, Napoleon, for the first time.
Composers Jan Ladislav Dussek and Louis Spohr are introduced by Herr Kiekhöver in Hamburg.
July 20 – The chapel created by Napoleon in the Tuileries is officially opened, with Giovanni Paisiello as its musical director.
August 15 – Luigi Cherubini, Étienne-Nicolas Méhul, François-Adrien Boieldieu, Rodolphe Kreutzer, Pierre Rode and Nicolò Isouard go into business as publishers of their own music.
October 6 – Ludwig van Beethoven writes to his brother Carl from Heiligenstadt, in despair over his increasing deafness.
Simon Mayr becomes maestro di cappella at Bergamo Cathedral.

Publications
Charles-Simon Catel – Traité d’harmonie (Paris: l'Imprimerie du Conservatoire de Musique)
Frédéric Duvernoy – Méthod pour le Cor (Mme Le Roi, Imprimerie du Conservatoire de Musique)
Johann Nikolaus Forkel – On Johann Sebastian Bach’s Life, Art, and Work: For Patriotic Admirers of True Musical Art (Leipzig: Hoffmeister und Kühnel)
John Gunn – An Essay Theoretical and Practical (London: Preston, for the author)
Christian Kalkbrenner – Histoire de la Musique (Paris: Amand Kœnig)
Heinrich Christoph Koch – Musikalisches Lexikon (Frankfurt am Main: August Hermann der Jüngere)
Jean-Xavier Lefèvre – Méthode de clarinette (Paris: Imprimerie du Conservatoire de Musique)
Georg Joseph Vogler – Handbuch zur Harmonielehre (Prague: K. Barth)

Classical music
Ludwig van Beethoven 
Second Symphony
6 Ländler, WoO 15
Bagatelle in C Major, WoO 54
"No, Non Tubarti", WoO 92a
"Ne' giorni tuoi felici", WoO 93
"Graf, Graf, Liebster Graf" WoO 101
3 Piano Sonatas, Op. 31
6 Variations in F Major, Op. 34
Eroica Variations, Op. 35
Matthieu Frédéric Blasius – Clarinet Concerto No. 1
Giuseppe Maria Cambini – Wind Quintet Nos.1–3
Muzio Clementi – 3 Piano Sonatas, Op. 40
Jan Ladislav Dussek 
Duo in F major, Op. 26
Piano Sonata No.17, Op. 43
Piano Sonatas Nos. 19–21, Op. 45
Piano Sonatas Nos. 22–23, Op. 47
Emanuel Aloys Förster – 3 String Quartets, Op. 21
Joseph Haydn – Harmoniemesse, his last major work 
Johann Nepomuk Hummel – Piano Quintet for piano, violin, viola, cello and bass, Op. 87 (inspiration for Schubert's "Trout" quintet)
Franz Krommer 
Flute Concerto No.1, Op. 30
Concerto for 2 Clarinets in E-flat major, Op. 35
Ignaz Pleyel – Symphonie concertante in F major, B.115
Johann Friedrich Reichardt – Das Zauberschloss (singspiel)
Louis Spohr - Violin Concerto No. 1, Op. 1
Anton Ferdinand Titz – 3 String Quartets
Samuel Wesley – Symphony in B-flat
Carl Friedrich Zelter – Sammlung kleiner Balladen und Lieder, Z.123

Opera
Charles-Simon Catel – Sémiramis
Michael Kelly – Urania
Giovanni Simone Mayr – I misteri eleusini (premiered Jan. 6 in Milan)
Etienne Nicolas Méhul – Le trésor supposé
William Reeve – Family Quarrels (comic opera)
Carl Maria Von Weber – Peter Schmoll und seine Nachbarn

Births

 February 7 – Johann Nepomuk Vogl, lyricist (died 1866)
 February 20 – Charles-Auguste de Bériot, composer and violinist (died 1870)
 February 25 – Georg Scheurlin, music publisher (died 1872)

 February 26 – Victor Hugo, librettist and poet (died 1885)
 March 3 – Adolphe Nourrit, operatic tenor  (died 1839)
March 5 – James Turle, editor and organist (died 1882)
 May 31 
 Eduard Grund, composer (died 1871)
 Cesare Pugni, Italian composer (died 1870)
 July 3 – Joseph Labitzky, composer and conductor (died 1881)
 July 12 – Charles-Louis-Joseph Hanssens, composer (died 1852)
 July 15 – John Barnett, English composer (died 1890)
 July 24 – Alexandre Dumas, librettist and writer (died 1870)
 July 27 – Ida Henriette da Fonseca, alto, composer (died 1858)
 August 13 – Nikolaus Lenau, lyricist and poet (died 1850)
 August 23 – Manuel Inocêncio Liberato dos Santos, musician and composer (died 1887)
August 28 – Karl Joseph Simrock, librettist and poet (died 1876)
September 18 – Jean-Amédée Lefroid de Méreaux, composer (died 1874)
 September 19 – Lajos Kossuth, dedicatee and politician (died 1894)
 September 24 – Alexander James Edmund Cockburn, librettist and Lord Chief Justice (died 1880)
 October 7 – Bernhard Molique, composer (died 1869)
 October 10 – George Pope Morris, librettist and publisher (died 1864)
 date unknown
Jean-Baptiste Duvernoy, pianist and composer (died c. 1880)
Ureli Corelli Hill, conductor (died 1875)
George Alexander Lee, singer and composer (died 1851)
 Marion Dix Sullivan, American composer (died 1860)
 José Zapiola, conductor and composer (died 1885)

Deaths
January 27 – Johann Rudolf Zumsteeg, conductor and composer, 42
March 7 – Johann Georg Witthauer, composer, 51
April 10 – Charlotte Brent, operatic soprano, 66
April 18 – Erasmus Darwin, lyricist and physician (born 1731)
July 26 – Rose-Adélaïde Ducreux, painter and musician, 41 (yellow fever)
July 28 – Giuseppe Sarti, composer, 72
August 10 – Antonio Lolli, violinist and composer (born c. 1725)
August 23 – Corona Schröter, singer, 51
September 28 – Heinrich Harries, lyricist and pastor (born 1762)
October 2 – Giuseppe Millico, castrato singer, composer and music teacher, 65
October 22 – Samuel Arnold, composer and organist, 62

References

 
19th century in music
Music by year